Celine Engelstad AS is a Norwegian jewelry company headquartered in Oslo, Norway. The company was founded in 2007 by Celine Engelstad and Gunnvor Vik. The company produces handmade unique jewelry. They launched their first jewelry collection in October 2008.

By today several well-known persons are fond of being associated with the brand Celine Engelstad. Among others, to be mentioned are Lady Gaga, Rihanna, Paris Hilton, Tone Damli Aaberge, Prinsesse Märtha Louise and Daniel Franck.

Description 
Since their market entry in 2008 the company has been growing at 40 percent (2009–2010), highlighted by the recent establishment of an AS in 2010. Suppliers are located outside Hong Kong, and the chain has a total of 60 stores in Norway. The company's two main dealers are Mestergull and Thune.

The firm offers handmade and partly machine-made unique jewelry, focusing on details, hand-crafting and unique combinations of materials. Silver and 14 carat gold are used as basic materials, decorated with Swarovski crystals, freshwater pearls, leather, glass and other stones.

References 

 Interview with: Sandra Drgala, employee at Celine Engelstad AS

External links 
  - Official Homepage for Celine Engelstad
  - Press release 2008
  - Dealers in Norway
  - Mestergull
  - Thune

Jewellery companies of Norway
Manufacturing companies established in 2008
Companies based in Oslo
Norwegian brands